Children of My Heart is a novel by Gabrielle Roy, published in 1977. The novel, Roy's last published work of fiction, was originally published in French as Ces enfants de ma vie.

The novel's protagonist is "Gabrielle Roy", a young teacher in a 1930s Prairie town. Based on Roy's own experiences as a teacher, the novel focuses on Gabrielle Roy's relationship with her students.

Awards and nominations
The novel won the 1977 Governor General's Award for French language fiction. Its English translation was selected for inclusion in the 2007 edition of Canada Reads, where it was championed by journalist Denise Bombardier. It was, however, the first book voted out of the competition by the panelists.

Film, TV or theatrical adaptations
The novel was adapted into a television film in 2000. Directed by Keith Ross Leckie, the film starred Geneviève Désilets, Geneviève Bujold and Michael Moriarty.

External links

 Screendoor
 Review by Carole Gerson, Canadian Literature, 1988, pp 124 – 126

1977 Canadian novels
Novels by Gabrielle Roy
Canadian drama television films
2000 television films
2000 films
Novels set in Manitoba
Fiction set in the 1930s
Governor General's Award-winning fiction books
McClelland & Stewart books
2000s English-language films
2000s Canadian films